Topağaç can refer to:

 Topağaç, Kovancılar
 Topağaç, Refahiye